UFC 264: Poirier vs. McGregor 3 was a mixed martial arts event produced by the Ultimate Fighting Championship that took place on July 10, 2021 at the T-Mobile Arena in Paradise, Nevada, part of the Las Vegas Metropolitan Area, United States.

Background

A lightweight trilogy between former interim UFC Lightweight Champion Dustin Poirier and former UFC Featherweight and Lightweight Champion Conor McGregor headlined the event. Their first fight was a featherweight bout that happened in September 2014 at UFC 178, where McGregor won by first-round technical knockout. They then ascended to lightweight for an eventual rematch in January 2021 at UFC 257, where Poirier prevailed via second-round knockout. During fight week, it was revealed that former lightweight champion Rafael dos Anjos was selected by the organization to serve as a potential replacement in case of need.

A middleweight bout between former KSW Welterweight Champion Dricus du Plessis and Trevin Giles was scheduled to take place at UFC on ESPN: Brunson vs. Holland, but du Plessis was pulled from the event due to visa issues which restricted his travel. The pairing was rescheduled and took place at this event.

A welterweight bout between Sean Brady and former interim UFC Lightweight Championship challenger Kevin Lee was expected to take place at the event. However, Lee withdrew due to injury and the bout was removed from the event.

A bantamweight bout between Sean O'Malley and Louis Smolka was expected to take place at the event. However on June 29, Smolka withdrew due to an undisclosed injury. He was replaced by promotional newcomer Kris Moutinho.

At the weigh-ins, Irene Aldana weighed in at 139.5 pounds, three and a half pounds over the bantamweight non-title fight limit. Her bout proceeded at catchweight and she was fined 30% of her purse, which went to her opponent Yana Kunitskaya.

On July 9, it was announced that the UFC would be increasing bonuses (Fight of the Night and Performance of the Night) from $50,000 to $75,000 for this event.

A middleweight bout between Alen Amedovski and Hu Yaozong was scheduled to the be the first preliminary bout of the event. However, it was cancelled just hours before taking place due to COVID-19 protocol issues in Amedovski's camp.

Results

Bonus awards
The following fighters received $75,000 bonuses.
Fight of the Night: Sean O'Malley vs. Kris MoutinhoPerformance of the Night: Tai Tuivasa and Dricus du Plessis'''

See also 

 List of UFC events
 List of current UFC fighters
 2021 in UFC

References 

Ultimate Fighting Championship events
2021 in mixed martial arts
2021 in sports in Nevada
Mixed martial arts in Las Vegas
Sports competitions in Las Vegas
July 2021 sports events in the United States
Events in Paradise, Nevada